Hymenopappus scabiosaeus, the Carolina woollywhite, is a North American species of flowering plant in the daisy family. It grows in the central and southeastern United States, primarily on the Great Plains an on the Coastal Plain of the Southeast. There are also isolated populations in Illinois and Indiana as well as in the state of Coahuila in northern Mexico.

Hymenopappus scabiosaeus is a biennial herb up to 150 cm (5 feet) tall. It produces 20-100 flower heads per stem, each head with 20-80 white disc flowers but no ray flowers.

Varieties
Hymenopappus scabiosaeus var. corymbosus (Torr. & A.Gray) B.L.Turner - Kansas, Nebraska, Oklahoma, Texas, Coahuila
Hymenopappus scabiosaeus var. scabiosaeus - Alabama, Arkansas, Florida, Georgia, Illinois, Indiana, Mississippi, Missouri, Oklahoma, South Carolina

References

External links
Discover Life
Southeastern Flora
Kansas Native Plants

scabiosaeus
Flora of the Great Plains (North America)
Flora of the United States
Flora of the Southeastern United States
Flora of Coahuila
Plants described in 1788
Flora without expected TNC conservation status